Siva Prasad Barooah (1880–1938) was a renowned planter, philanthropist, politician, and humanist from Assam. He was the pioneer or path-breaker in Assamese journalism who published Batori, the first daily newspaper in Assam. The Siva Prasad Barooah National Award, instituted in his fond memory, is being given to individual or group, by The Kamal Kumari Foundation since 1999, for outstanding contributions to the field of journalism. He belongs to the famous Khongiya Barooah family of Thengal, the family that emerged as the champion of Assamese interests and repository of Assamese Culture and traditions. He was the richest tea-planter at that time in India. He married Kamal Kumari Barooah in 1917 and noted Indian entrepreneur, tea planter and philanthropist Hemendra Prasad Barooah was his son.

References

Official website
Kamal Kumari awards announced

People from Jorhat district
Assam politicians
Indian humanists
Journalists from Assam
Indian planters
1880 births
1938 deaths
20th-century Indian philanthropists
Planters in British India
Philanthropists in British India